Nava Bharathi Vidya Niketan High School is located in Pragi, a town in the Ranga Reddy district of India.

See also
Education in India
List of schools in India

References

External links 

High schools and secondary schools in Hyderabad, India
1989 establishments in Andhra Pradesh
Educational institutions established in 1989